From its peculiar habit, Duabanga grandiflora (syn. D. sonneratioides) is a singular feature in its native forests. The trunk is erect, 40–80 feet high, undivided but sometimes forking from the base. The lower limbs spread drooping from the trunk; these are long, slender, sparingly branched, and the branches are four-angled, loosely covered with large spreading leaves. Since the leaves are arranged in two ranks, the slender branches resemble petioles, bearing pinnae of a compound leaf; the leaves are further often recurved, and are deep green above, and almost white beneath. The large blossoms expand in April, exhaling a rank odour reportedly resembling asafoetida when they first burst, but they become inodorous before the petals drop. The stamens are all bent inwards in bud. The fruit is a large as a small apple. The wood is white and soft.

Distribution 
Native to India, Nepal, southern China, Myanmar and Malaysia.

Gallery

References

grandiflora
Trees of the Indian subcontinent
Trees of Indo-China
Trees of Peninsular Malaysia